Alithinou is a small village in the Nicosia District of Cyprus, located near Platanistasa.

References

Communities in Nicosia District